My House Husband: Ikaw Na! (or simply My House Husband) is a 2011 comedy drama film directed by José Javier Reyes that stars Judy Ann Santos and Ryan Agoncillo (who are married in real life), including Eugene Domingo. It was an official entry for the 2011 Metro Manila Film Festival and was released on December 25, 2011.

Synopsis
The story revolves around a married couple, Mia (Judy Ann Santos) and Rod (Ryan Agoncillo), who have a bunch of problems and endless arguments. Since then Rod has resigned from his job and made Mia find another one, while he takes charge of household chores and their children. With Mia always away, Rod meets their new neighbor named Aida (Eugene Domingo), and the two develop a friendship. Will Mia know about this? If she does, how are they going to solve it?

Cast
Judy Ann Santos as Mia Alvarez
Ryan Agoncillo as Rodrigo "Rod" Alvarez
Eugene Domingo as Aida
Agot Isidro as Cynthia
Francine Prieto as Tessie
Miriam Quiambao as Veron
Rocco Nacino as Erik
Renz Valerio as Stephen
Derick Monasterio as Chad
Lexi Fernandez as Mimay
Boots Anson-Roa as Lilia
Dante Rivero as Delfin
Bobby Andrews as Ariel
Sabrina Man as Kaye
Johnny Revilla as Henry
Mel Kimura as Yolly
Malou Crisologo as Sofia
Aaron Novilla as Ethan
Cai Cortez as Stella Villafrancia
Chinggay Riego as Pia Villafrancia

Awards

Release

Box office
My House Husband: Ikaw Na! earned PHP 17.33 million on its opening day making it as the fourth overall grossing films for the 2011 Metro Manila Film Festival. On its second day, it grossed over PHP 30.3 million and at the fourth place behind Enteng Ng Ina Mo, Ang Panday 2 and Segunda Mano.

References

External links
 

Philippine comedy-drama films
2010s Tagalog-language films
OctoArts Films films
Films directed by José Javier Reyes